Al-Shatra District is a district of the Dhi Qar Governorate, Iraq.

Districts of Dhi Qar Province